The Autoroute A40 is a motorway in France that extends from Mâcon on the west to Passy on the east, terminating not far from Chamonix and the Mont Blanc Tunnel. The road runs  through Bresse, the high southern Jura Mountains, northern Prealps and French Alps. It was fully completed in 1990, and includes 12 viaducts and 3 tunnels. The road is maintained by Autoroutes Paris-Rhin-Rhône (APRR and ATMB), comprising part of European routes E25 and E62.

Nomenclature

Autoroute A40 is named Autoroute des Titans ("Highway of the Titans") for the dramatic engineering construction through the mountainous sections between Bourg-en-Bresse and Bellegarde-sur-Valserine, and as Autoroute Blanche ("the White Motorway") through the snow-laden Jura and Alps between Bellegarde-sur-Valserine and Annemasse on the Swiss border.

History

ATMB
 1973 : The section between Vallard and Bonneville was opened.
 1974 : The section between Bonneville and Cluses was opened.
 1975 : The section between Cluses and Sallanches was opened.
 1976 : The section between Sallanches-Passy was opened in a ceremony presided over by Prime Minister Jacques Chirac.
 1982 : The 50 kilometre section between Bellegarde and Annemasse is opened.

These sections were previously numbered B41.

APRR
 1985 : Section between Bourg-Nord and -Bourg-Sud (20 km) completed.
 1986 : Opening of section between Bourg-Sud and Sylans (Nantua) (61 km). The French President, François Mitterrand opened the motorway giving it the name L'Autoroute des Titans.
 1987 : Opening of the section Mâcon to Bourg-Nord (27 km)
 1989 : Opening of the section Sylans to Châtillon-en-Michaille (13 km)
 1990 : Opening of the junction between the A6 autoroute and the A40 (3 km)
 1995 : Widening of the Chamoise Tunnel and viaduct at Nantua and Neyrolles

The western section between the A6 and A42 was originally given the number F42. The whole road was re-numbered the A40 including a short section where the road merges with the A42.

Characteristics
The autoroute is made up of two lanes for each traffic direction except between its junctions with the A42 and A39 (21 km) where there are three lanes on each side.

Junctions

References

External links

A40 autoroute in Saratlas

A40